Edgar Badia Guardiola (born 12 February 1992) is a Spanish professional footballer who plays for Elche CF as a goalkeeper.

Club career

Espanyol
Born in Barcelona, Catalonia, Badia was a youth product of local RCD Espanyol. He spent his first seasons as a senior competing in Segunda División B and Tercera División with the B team.

On 11 January 2012, Badia made his official debut for the main squad, playing the full 90 minutes in a 4–2 home win against Córdoba CF in the round of 16 of the Copa del Rey (5–4 on aggregate). He continued to be almost exclusively associated with the B's during his spell.

Reus
Badia signed with Granada CF in July 2013, being assigned to the reserves in the third division. On 20 January of the following year, after acting as a backup to Stole Dimitrievski, he terminated his contract with the Andalusians and moved to fellow league team CF Reus Deportiu.

Badia was an undisputed starter for the club in the following campaigns, achieving promotion to Segunda División in 2016. On 28 December 2018, he was one of five players to leave due to unpaid wages.

Elche
On 5 January 2019, Badia signed a six-month contract with Elche CF also of the second tier. He made 42 appearances – playoffs included – in the 2019–20 campaign, in a return to La Liga after a five-year absence.

Badia made his debut in the Spanish top flight on 26 September 2020, in a 0–3 home loss to Real Sociedad.

Career statistics

Club

Honours
Spain U19
UEFA European Under-19 Championship: 2011

Spain U17
FIFA U-17 World Cup third place: 2009

References

External links

1992 births
Living people
Spanish footballers
Footballers from Barcelona
Association football goalkeepers
La Liga players
Segunda División players
Segunda División B players
Tercera División players
UE Cornellà players
RCD Espanyol B footballers
RCD Espanyol footballers
Club Recreativo Granada players
CF Reus Deportiu players
Elche CF players
Spain youth international footballers
Catalonia international footballers